Battle of Dilam was a major battle of the Unification War between Rashidi and Saudi rebels. It occurred on 27 January 1903, in the town of Dilam south of Riyadh, the capital of the present day Saudi Arabia.

A year after the Battle of Riyadh, Ibn Saud attempted to draw Rashidis away from Riyadh with a campaign of misinformation. When his plan succeeded, Saud deployed 1,000 fighters in Riyadh before leaving the city with another 3,500 to capture Dilam. The Rashidis followed Ibn Saud to Dilam in order to finish him off and regain control the town.

Ibn Saud had however borrowed money from Riyadh merchants and spent it purchasing ammunition and hiring specialist riflemen from Kuwait. Ibn Saud's forces took up fixed positions around Dilam, waited until the Rashidis were very close and then poured fire on them, forcing them to retreat. Further Rashidi attacks were met the same way. The next morning the Rashidi forces withdrew. They did not know that Ibn Saud's stock of ammunition was nearly depleted, and that further attacks might well have forced a Saudi retreat instead.

During the battle, the Rashidis suffered 250 casualties and lost control of southern Nejd.

References

1903 in Saudi Arabia
Dilam
Dilam